This list of awards for male actors is an index to articles to describe awards given to male actors. It excludes film awards for lead actor and television awards for Best Actor, which are covered by separate lists.

General

Film awards for male debut actors

TV awards for lead actor

Television awards for Best Supporting Actor

See also

 Lists of awards
 Lists of acting awards
 List of film awards for lead actor
 List of television awards for Best Actor

References

 
Male actors
 
 
Film awards for male debut actors